The Sacred Heart of Jesus is a giant statue of Jesus Christ in Roxas City in the Philippines. The  monument, said to be the tallest of its kind in the Philippines, was built in 2015 within the Pueblo de Panay mixed-use development.

Physical characteristics 

Maximum height  = 102 ft / 31 m (heel to the tip of the highest finger)
 Chin to cranium = 3.80 m
 Head thickness = 2.50 m  (temple to temple)
 Distance between the eye  = 0.55 m
 Width of eye  = 0.14 m
 Length of eye = 0.49 m
 Eyebrow bridge to cranium = 1.20 m
 Height of nose = 1.20 m
 Base of nose to chin  = 1.40 m
 Length of mouth = 0.75 m
 Core wall to the elbow = 5.0 m
 Estimated weight of the head= 6.5 to 7.0 tons  (cement used on the head - 50 pcs. 40 kg. bags)

History 
The construction of the statue began on the last quarter of 2011 and was completed on January 5, 2015. The construction of the statue was done by a seven-man core team led by a Pilipino sculptor John A. Alaban from Roxas City and the foreman Jose Clarito. As of the date of completion, the giant statue of The Sacred Heart of Jesus of Roxas City is considered the largest life like statue of Jesus Christ in the Philippines. 
 

It took a little more than three years for a seven-man core team to complete the construction but since the work runs on and off, the actual work span could be summed up to only about two years and 8 months more or less. The statue has a maximum height of 102 ft. / 31 m and mounted on a 9m / 30 ft high base making the total height  . It is supported by a 0.40 m thick  by  elevator shaft style reinforced concrete core post. Every level of 3 meters high (equivalent to one standard building floor height) is separated by a horizontal slab. Inside the hollow statue is an access steel stair up to the 8th level. The stairs is for the use of the authorize crew only and is off limits to the public. Since one of the concepts of the construction is the so-called “built to last”, some forms or aesthetics have been deliberately compromised to give way to the stability of the structural design for the safety of the general public.

Gallery

See also
 List of statues of Jesus

References 

Colossal statues of Jesus
2015 sculptures
Buildings and structures in Roxas, Capiz
Religious buildings and structures completed in 2015
Monuments and memorials in the Philippines
2015 establishments in the Philippines
Tourist attractions in Capiz